Tyler Island is a small island in the San Joaquin River delta, part of Sacramento County, California. It is named after 1861 owner W.C. Tyler, and managed by Reclamation Districts 563 and 554.

References

Islands of Sacramento County, California
Islands of the Sacramento–San Joaquin River Delta
Islands of Northern California